Dan J. Schmidt (born August 3, 1954, in Salem, Oregon) is an American politician and a former Democratic member of the Idaho Senate. He served as a state senator from  2010 to 2016.

Education and career
Schmidt attended the University of Washington, where he earned his medical degree. He later served over ten years as the Latah County Coroner.

Schmidt was appointed by Senate Minority Leader Michelle Stennett to serve on Idaho's Independent Redistricting Commission.

Elections

References

1954 births
21st-century American politicians
American coroners
Democratic Party Idaho state senators
Living people
People from Moscow, Idaho
Physicians from Oregon
Politicians from Salem, Oregon
Stanford University alumni
University of Washington School of Medicine alumni